The 1894 North Dakota Agricultural Aggies football team was an American football team that represented North Dakota Agricultural College (now known as North Dakota State University) as an independent during the 1894 college football season. It was their first season in existence. Their head coach was Henry Luke Bolley. They had a record of 2-0.

Schedule

References

North Dakota Agricultural
North Dakota State Bison football seasons
College football undefeated seasons
North Dakota Agricultural Aggies football